Peter Herda (born 25 November 1956 in Jacovce) is a Slovak former footballer. He played for Slavia Prague, Slovan Bratislava, RH Cheb, Charleloi and Bourges. Herda played once for the Czechoslovakia national side. He is a member of the Klubu ligových kanonýrů after scoring more than one hundred goals in his career.

Club career
Herda began playing for Slavia Prague in 1974. He was joint top scorer with Ladislav Vízek during the 1981–82 Czechoslovak First League season with fifteen goals scored. He later played for Slavia Prague, Slovan Bratislava, RH Cheb, Charleloi and Bourges.

International career
His only appearance for Czechoslovakia was in a 2–0 victory against East Germany where he played 45 minutes.

Personal life
Herda became a taxi driver working in Prague.

His brother Dušan Herda was a footballer who was in the Czechoslovakia squad that won the 1976 UEFA European Football Championship.

Honours and achievements

Individual
Performances
 Czechoslovak First League top goalscorer: 1981–82

References

External links
Career stats at csfotbal.cz
Peter Herda at FAČR 

1956 births
Living people
Slovak footballers
Czechoslovak footballers
Czechoslovakia international footballers
Association football forwards
SK Slavia Prague players
ŠK Slovan Bratislava players
R. Charleroi S.C. players
FK Hvězda Cheb players
People from Topoľčany District
Sportspeople from the Nitra Region